In aviation, lateral navigation (LNAV, usually pronounced el-nav) is azimuth navigation, without vertical navigation (VNAV). Area navigation (RNAV) approach plates include LNAV as a non-precision instrument approach (NPA).  When combined with VNAV, the resulting instrument approach, LNAV/VNAV, is referred to as an Approach with Vertical Guidance (APV).

Instrument approaches
An LNAV approach is flown to a Minimum Descent Altitude, MDA, while an LNAV/VNAV approach is flown to a Decision Altitude, DA.  If WAAS becomes unavailable, a GPS or WAAS equipped aircraft can revert to the LNAV MDA using GPS only.

See also
LPV
Navigation

External links
FAA: LNAV (Lateral Navigation) (archived version)

References

Aircraft controls